Alice Vannoorenberghe, also known by her stage name Alice et Moi (Alice and Me) or Alice Vanor, is a French electropop singer-songwriter. She made her debut in 2017 with the release of her EP Filme Moi. Her first studio album Drama was released on 21 May 2021.

Biography

Beginnings 
Born in Paris, Alice began writing and singing at a young age, encouraged by her music-loving father, who was a member of a punk group in his adolescence. After finishing secondary school, Alice attended preparatory classes in literature and humanities and eventually obtained a master's degree in journalism at Sciences Po before starting the project of "Alice et Moi" in 2016. In October 2017, she independently released her first EP called Filme Moi, followed by Frénésie in 2019. Alice announced the name and tracklist of her debut studio album on 23 April 2021. The album, called Drama, was released on 21 May 2021 under Sony Music Entertainment France.

Eye and stage name 
Alice remembers that at the age of fourteen or fifteen, she drew an eye on her hand. Ever since, the eye has signified creation to her and has encouraged her to feel better.

The name "Alice et Moi" references the duality of her personality. In an interview with Lemon, she explains that one side of her is a girl who is insecure about herself, while the other side, which, according to her, is more prevalent today, is a "very enthusiastic" girl, "who is not afraid of anything". Furthermore, she says that her stage name allows her fans to "share a bond" with her and to create intimacy by pronouncing the name.

Discography

EPs 
Credits adapted from Spotify.

Album 
Credits adapted from Spotify.

Singles

Music videos

References 

Living people
French women singer-songwriters
French women pop singers
21st-century French women singers
1992 births
Sciences Po alumni